Karen ní Mheallaigh is Professor of Classics and Director of Graduate Studies at Johns Hopkins University with a research specialism in ancient fiction.

Education 
Ní Mheallaigh received her BA in 1997 and a PhD in Classics from Trinity College Dublin in 2005.

Career 
Ní Mheallaigh taught at Liverpool (2004–2005), Swansea (2005–2007) and Exeter (2007–2020) before taking up her position at The Johns Hopkins University in 2020.  She has also held a fellowship from the Arts and Humanities Research Council of the UK (2011–2012) and a Marie Curie fellowship at the Aarhus Institute of Advanced Studies (AIAS), Denmark (2014–2016), where she worked on the project "Discovering the ancient scientific imagination".

Selected publications 
Monographs:

 The Moon in the Greek and Roman imagination: selenography in myth, literature, science and philosophy. Cambridge and New York: Cambridge University Press, 2020.
 Reading fiction with Lucian: fakes, freaks and hyperreality. Cambridge: Cambridge University Press, 2014.

Edited books:

 Cueva, E., G. Schmeling, P. James, K. ní Mheallaigh, S. Panayotakis, N. Scippacercola. 2018. Re-Wiring the Ancient Novel. Volume 2: Roman Novels and other important texts. Ancient Narrative Supplement 24.2. Groningen.

References

External links 
 Roman Society and Hellenic Society Lecture, 'Novel entertainments: from pantomime to the moon': https://www.youtube.com/watch?v=KBtapreoMLE
 Review of The Moon in the Greek and Roman Imagination, Times Literary Supplement: https://www.the-tls.co.uk/articles/the-moon-in-the-greek-and-roman-imagination-karen-ni-mheallaigh-review-james-romm/

Year of birth missing (living people)
Living people
American classical scholars
Women classical scholars
Alumni of Trinity College Dublin
Johns Hopkins University alumni